A hammam, or Turkish bath, is a type of steam bath or place of public bathing associated with the Islamic world.

Hamam (also transliterated as Hmam, Hāmam and Hammam, with different meanings) may refer to:

People
 Adem Hmam (born 1995), Tunisian table tennis player
 Sam Hammam (born 1948), Lebanese businessman and football club owner
 Wissem Hmam (born 1981), Tunisian basketball
 Abood Hamam (born 1975), Syrian photographer

Places
 Hamaam, Israel
 Hamam, Kumlu, Hatay Province, Turkey
 Hamamköy, or Hamam, Mersin Province, Turkey
 Hammam, East Azerbaijan, Iran
 Hammam, Khuzestan, Iran
 Yekeh Chah, or Hammam, Markazi Province, Iran

Other uses
 Hamam (soap), a brand of soap in India
 Hamam (film), a 1997 Italian-Turkish-Spanish film

See also

Arabic-language surnames